The Europe/Africa Zone was one of the three zones of the regional Davis Cup competition in 1993.

In the Europe/Africa Zone there were three different tiers, called groups, in which teams competed against each other to advance to the upper tier. Winners in Group II advanced to the Europe/Africa Zone Group I. Teams who lost their respective ties competed in the relegation play-offs, with winning teams remaining in Group II, whereas teams who lost their play-offs were relegated to the Europe/Africa Zone Group III in 1994.

Participating nations

Draw

 and  promoted to Group I in 1994.

First round

Bulgaria vs. Poland

South Africa vs. Ivory Coast

Greece vs. Tunisia

Senegal vs. Egypt

Ireland vs. Ghana

Morocco vs. Cyprus

Monaco vs. Algeria

Nigeria vs. Romania

Second round

Bulgaria vs. South Africa

Senegal vs. Greece

Morocco vs. Ireland

Monaco vs. Romania

Relegation play-offs

Ivory Coast vs. Poland

Tunisia vs. Egypt

Ghana vs. Cyprus

Nigeria vs. Algeria

Third round

Senegal vs. South Africa

Romania vs. Morocco

References

External links
Davis Cup official website

Davis Cup Europe/Africa Zone
Europe Africa Zone Group II